"General Grant's March" is a World War I era march song composed by E. Mack. It was written for piano and published between 1900 and 1920 by DeLuxe Music Co. in New York, NY. The "general Grant" in the title is Ulysses S. Grant, who was general during the American Civil War. The memory of his victory was meant to bring spirit to the soldiers through this song.

The sheet music can be found at the Pritzker Military Museum & Library.

References 

Songs of World War I
March music
Cultural depictions of Ulysses S. Grant
Songs about military officers
Year of song unknown